Anuradha Patel, known as Anu, is an Indian-born sculptor, who works in the United Kingdom.

A number of her works are on public display in the West Midlands and Leicester; several of these were commissioned by the local transport authority, Centro, to decorate information points at transport interchanges. She was also featured in the 'Transition of Riches' exhibition at Birmingham Museum and Art Gallery in 1993.

Works 

 Jewellery Quarter gateway posts, Birmingham
 Railings for the relocated statue of Hebe by Robert Thomas, Birmingham
 24 hour Route - railings on the ramp between the Bull Ring and Moor Street station, Birmingham
 Railing for St. Thomas' Peace Garden, Birmingham
 Cutting Edge railings along Northbrook Street, Birmingham above the Birmingham Canal Main Line
 Wednesbury Parkway windmill
 "Lotus Flowers" - ten internally illuminated freestanding structures on Burley's Way roundabout, Belgrave Gate, Leicester.

For Centro 

 Aspire, The Hawthorns railway station
 Cascading Mountain, Wake Green Road, Moseley
 Furnace, Halesowen Street, Oldbury
 The Peacock, Sandwell & Dudley railway station
 Spirit, Alcester Road, Moseley
 Voyage, Bearwood bus station
 Wing Wheel, Alcester Road South, Kings Heath

References

External links 

 

Year of birth missing (living people)
Place of birth missing (living people)
20th-century British sculptors
21st-century sculptors
British women sculptors
Indian emigrants to England
20th-century British women artists
21st-century British women artists
Living people